Sagar Sangam is a 1988 Hindi-language film. A family drama, it had a very long delayed release. The film was announced in 1985, had its records released in 1986. It stars Raakhee, Asha Parekh, Shatrughan Sinha, Mithun Chakraborty, Padmini Kolhapure, Anita Raj, Nana Patekar, Johnny Walker, Prem Chopra, Utpal Dutt. The music was composed by Bappi Lahiri.

Cast

Raakhee as Ganga
Asha Parekh as Yashoda
Shatrughan Sinha as Inspector Arjun Sharma
Mithun Chakraborty as Gopal / Gopi
Padmini Kolhapure as Radha
Anita Raj as Subhadra
Nana Patekar as Ramnath Shastri / Ramu Ustad
Johnny Walker as Inspector Shamsher Singh
Prem Chopra as Chhaganlal / Dayal Das
Utpal Dutt as Bhujang Chaudhary
Vijay Arora as Pandit
Goga Kapoor as Thakur
Jagdish Raj as Police Superintendent
Sudhir Pandey as CID Inspector Jaishankar
Paintal as Girdhari
Birbal as Manglu
Prema Narayan as Mary
Mac Mohan as Maqbool
Satyen Kappu as Binu
T. P. Jain as Lallu

Songs

Plot
Ganga's husband is accused of robbery and sent to prison while outside the court a conmen abducts her son and goes to sell it to Chagganlal but his wife Yashoda adopts the son as she is feels they are childless due to Chagganlal's crimes who forces kids to beg. Chagganlal gets arrested and jailed for a year when he comes out he takes Yashoda
long with her leaving her son Gopi on his own whose raised by a criminal Ramu Ustad who has eyes of treasure of Devupur Temple. Years later Gopi turns to be a thief
and gets arrested by Inspector Arjun Sharma where he is permitted from entry boundaries of Mumbai and goes to Devipur where he finds that Ganga is respected by every
villagers and runs a temple trust but does not allow Gopi to enter the temple as he is a criminal. Gopi finds a Sister in Subhadra and falls in love with Radha he notices illegal activities in the village run by Dayal Das whose none other then Chagganlal and also recognizes Yashoda but is reluctant to approach due to his background. Arjun gets transferred to Devipur and finds truth about Gopi and Yadhoda and both team up to expose Dayal Das but Ramu Ustad reaches the village to rob the treasure while Arjun and Gopi find that there is one more person over Chagagnlal whose controlling everything.

References

External links
 
http://entertainment.oneindia.in/bollywood/news/2008/anita-raj-comback-190608.html
https://web.archive.org/web/20100208052917/http://glamsham.com/movies/scoops/08/jun/18-anita-raaj-makes-a-comeback-060806.asp

1988 films
Films scored by Bappi Lahiri
1980s Hindi-language films